Alhambra High School (AHS) is a public high school in Alhambra, California established in 1898. Existing in the Alhambra Unified School District, it administers one of the most extensive high school and adult education programs in California, offering hundreds of academic, cultural, and recreational courses, day and evening, many located on the school grounds. In 2005, it was given a California Distinguished Schools award.

The school is located on Second Street, across the street from City Hall and the Police Department, bounded by Second Street, Commonwealth Avenue, Fifth Street, and Main Street. The campus is divided into three parts, by Third and Fourth Streets.

Present
As of January 2015, enrollment at AHS is 3080 students, In this ethnically-mixed school district, the high school is one of the three comprehensive high schools. Curriculum offerings encompass Reading for remedial instruction, to Advanced Placement courses in six subjects, including English composition, calculus, environmental science, physics, American government, United States history, world history, art history, Spanish, Chinese, and Psychology.

History
Around 1884, Alhambra citizens saw the need for their own school. 

On October 11, 2006, a small explosive device was found on a sidewalk bordering the north end of campus. Hours later, a second similar device was found in a trash can on the south end of campus.  The Los Angeles County sheriff's bomb squad safely removed and disabled both items, and the campus was searched.

In early 2007, the school was featured on the third season of Hell's Kitchen. 100 members from the senior class of 2007 were invited to participate. Each chef had to prepare 100 portions of a dish for each of the students.  It was one of a select few public high schools in California to be awarded a distinguished Great Schools Rating of 8 out of 10.

Demographics
In 2009-2010, the minority population was 95.8%, 31.6% of the students were limited English proficient, and 83.7% considered economically disadvantaged, received free or reduced lunch.

As of October 2009, the Alhambra High School student population was 48.7% Asian/Pacific Islander, 43.6% Hispanic, 5.9% White, 1.3% African American, and 0.1% Native American,  It is a Title I school.

Athletics

CIF championships
 Badminton: 2000
 Football 1928, 1939, 1946
 Wrestling: 2002

Music
The marching band was selected to march in the 2009 Pasadena Tournament of Roses Parade, the first time a band from Alhambra has been in the parade in 40 years.
The band made a second appearance in the 2020 Tournament of Roses Parade as part of the Alhambra Unified School District marching band.

The band marched in the Rose Parade on Jan. 1, 1964.

Alhambra High School alma mater, sung to the tune Annie Lisle by H.S. Thompson:

"In the city of Alhambra, challenging the eye,
stands a school above all others,
stands Alhambra High.
AHS to thee we shall be,
ever loyal and true.
Striving always to do service,
for the Gold and Blue.
When our high school days are over,
and we've scattered wide.
We'll recall the name ALHAMBRA,
and speak of her with pride."

Controversy
In April 2005, an article was published by The Moor, the school's biweekly newspaper, titled "Latinos Lag Behind in Academics". It discussed that Hispanic students' test scores have improved, then asked why Asian scores were noticeably higher, postulating that Asian students worked harder in academics than Hispanic students, suggesting the latter were "not pulling their weight". The Los Angeles Times discussed the achievement gap in context, noting the outrage and charges of racism towards the student author and the Latino pride response.

Honors
They are ranked 450 on Newsweek's list of 1,000 "Best High Schools in America".

Longtime teacher, Ted K. Tajima, who taught at the school for 35 years, advised the school newspaper and guided it to 26 All-American awards from the National Scholastic Press Association. In October 2016, the Alliance College-Ready Public Schools named one of its high schools after him.

Notable alumni

H. George Anderson, presiding Bishop, Evangelical Lutheran Church in America
Bob Boyd, former college basketball player and coach for the University of Southern California
Leo Carroll, NFL football player
Kevin Cheng, Hong Kong actor
Dean Cundey, director of photography
Clive Cussler, novelist
John C. England, US Navy officer who was killed during the Japanese attack on Pearl Harbor in 1941
Stan Freberg, voice actor and television personality
Grant Gershon, music director, Los Angeles Master Chorale
Hardie Gramatky, watercolorist
Sam Hanks, alumnus 1933, winner of the 1957 Indianapolis 500 and inducted into the Indianapolis Motor Speedway Hall of Fame in 1981.
Derek Hartley, co-host of the Derek and Romaine Show on Sirius XM Satellite Radio
Darrall Imhoff, NBA player and Olympic gold medalist
James Jannard, businessman
Ke Huy Quan, Vietnamese-American actor, most known for films such as The Goonies (1985) and  Everything Everywhere All At Once  (2022).
Ralph Kiner, former Major League baseball player and broadcaster, MLB Hall of Fame member
Aaron Krach, novelist, artist, magazine editor
Dan Larson, professional baseball player (Houston Astros, Philadelphia Phillies, Chicago Cubs)
John W. Olmsted (1915): Professor Emeritus at University of California, Riverside
Noé Ramirez, Major League Baseball pitcher for the Boston Red Sox and Los Angeles Angels
Jenny Oropeza, 1975, politician California State Senate, California State Assembly
Dorothy Howell Rodham, mother of Secretary of State Hillary Clinton
Lewis Sargentich, legal scholar at Harvard Law School
Tex Schramm, former general manager of the Dallas Cowboys (NFL)
Cheryl Tiegs, model
Mickey Thompson, race car driver
Jim Tunney, football official, author, motivational speaker
Martin Vasquez, soccer player and coach
Dick Wallen, UCLA football All-American, recipient of the 1957 W.J. Voit Memorial Trophy
Max West, professional baseball player
Verne Winchell, businessman
Mike Woo, politician, Class of 1969
Lisa Yee, children's author and winner of the Sid Fleischman Humor Award

References

External links
Alhambra High School website

Educational institutions established in 1898
High schools in Los Angeles County, California
Public high schools in California
Alhambra, California
1898 establishments in California